The 1963 Sacramento State Hornets football team represented Sacramento State College—now known as California State University, Sacramento—as a member of the Far Western Conference (FWC) during the 1963 NCAA College Division football season. Led by third-year head coach Ray Clemons, Sacramento State compiled an overall record of 6–2–1 with a mark of 2–2–1 in conference play, placing fourth in the FWC. For the season the team outscored its opponents 120 to 83. The Hornets played home games at Charles C. Hughes Stadium in Sacramento, California.

Schedule

References

Sacramento State
Sacramento State Hornets football seasons
Sacramento State Hornets football